Political Parties of Finland for Democracy - Demo Finland is a co-operative organisation of all the eight Finnish parliamentary parties supporting multi-party democracy in new and developing democracies.

Demo Finland's member parties are Centre Party (Finland), Finns Party, National Coalition Party, Social Democratic Party of Finland, Green League, Left Alliance (Finland), Swedish People's Party of Finland and Christian Democrats (Finland).

References

External links
 Demo Finland

Politics of Finland